Stefaan Tanghe (born 15 January 1972) is a Belgian former professional footballer who played as an attacking midfielder.

Career
Tanghe made his debut in professional football in the 1997–98 season when playing for Excelsior Moeskroen. He also played competitive matches for FC Utrecht.

International career
He earned 9 caps for the Belgium national football team.

Honours
FC Utrecht
 KNVB Cup: 2002–03, 2003–04
 Johan Cruyff Shield: 2004

References

1972 births
Living people
Belgian footballers
Royal Excel Mouscron players
FC Utrecht players
Heracles Almelo players
K.S.V. Roeselare players
Eredivisie players
Belgian Pro League players
Challenger Pro League players
Belgium international footballers
Belgian expatriate footballers
Expatriate footballers in the Netherlands
Belgian expatriate sportspeople in the Netherlands
Sportspeople from Kortrijk
Footballers from West Flanders
Association football midfielders